Progress 26 was a Soviet uncrewed Progress cargo spacecraft, which was launched in April 1986 to resupply the Mir space station.

Launch
Progress 26 launched on 23 April 1986 from the Baikonur Cosmodrome in the Kazakh SSR. It used a Soyuz-U2 rocket.

Docking
Progress 26 docked with the aft port of the Mir Core Module on 26 April 1986 at 21:26:06 UTC, and was undocked on 22 June 1986 at 18:25:00 UTC.

Decay
It remained in orbit until 23 June 1986, when it was deorbited. The deorbit burn occurred at 18:41:01 UTC.

See also

 1986 in spaceflight
 List of Progress missions
 List of uncrewed spaceflights to Mir

References

Progress (spacecraft) missions
1986 in the Soviet Union
Spacecraft launched in 1986
Spacecraft which reentered in 1986
Spacecraft launched by Soyuz-U rockets